The Palace of la Bolsa de Madrid (Spanish: Palacio de la Bolsa de Madrid) is a nineteenth-century building located in Madrid, Spain.  
It is a neo-classical building, featuring a portico supported by six Corinthian columns. It was given the heritage listing Bien de Interés Cultural in 1992.

History 
It was designed to house the main Spanish stock exchange, the Bolsa de Madrid, and was opened by the Queen Regent of Spain, Maria Cristina, in 1893.  The Bolsa de Madrid still occupies the building.

References

External links 

Bolsa
Neoclassical architecture in Madrid
Bien de Interés Cultural landmarks in Madrid
Buildings and structures in Jerónimos neighborhood, Madrid